Ian Craig (1935–2014) is an Australian cricketer.

Ian Craig may also refer to:
Ian Craig (English cricketer) (born 1931)
Ian Craig (footballer) (1952–1982)
Ian Craig (engineer), South African engineer
Ian William Craig, musician
Ian Craig (athlete) in Athletics at the 1998 Commonwealth Games – Men's 100 metres
Iain Craig in the 2015 World Senior Curling Championships – Men's tournament
Ian Craig, a character in This Man Craig